Colin Rafferty Marie Jude Bonini (born April 14, 1965) is an American politician and a Republican former member of the Delaware Senate, where he represented the 16th District from 1994 to 2022.

Bonini received his Bachelor of Arts from Wesley College in 1991. He received a Master of Public Administration from the University of Delaware in 1999. While in college, he worked for United States Senator Bill Roth and the United States Department of State in New Delhi, India.

He was elected in 1994 to represent the 16th District in the Delaware Senate. The district covers part of southern and eastern Kent County along with a small portion of adjacent Sussex County. It includes the southern portions of Dover around the Dover Air Force Base and the towns of Frederica and Harrington.

In 2010, Bonini unsuccessfully ran for state treasurer, losing to Democrat Chip Flowers. Flowers received 51 percent of the vote to defeat Bonini by 6,121 votes.

Shortly after the 2014 elections, Bonini announced he would run for governor in the following election. He stated that his campaign would focus on fixing the state's "significant systemic and fundamental problems", although he faced a significant obstacle as a Republican running statewide in the heavily Democratic state. Bonini competed with former state trooper Lacey Lafferty in the Republican primary election, which he won with 70% of the vote. He lost to U.S. Congressman John Carney in the general election, garnering less than 40% of the vote. In 2020, Bonini again tried to run for governor but lost in the Republican primary to Julianne Murray, earning less than 35% of the vote. On September 13, 2022, Bonini was defeated in the Republican primary, finishing last place in a 3-way race.

Electoral history

References

External links
 
 
 Project Vote Smart – Senator Colin Bonini (DE) profile

|-

1965 births
21st-century American politicians
Candidates in the 2016 United States elections
Republican Party Delaware state senators
Identical twins
Living people
People from Dover, Delaware
People from Stanford, California
American twins
Wesley College (Delaware) alumni
Candidates in the 2020 United States elections